The AC Mobil 34 Chrysalin is a two-seat light aircraft produced in France in kitplane form. The aircraft was designed to comply with the Fédération Aéronautique Internationale microlight rules.

Design and development
Constructed of composite materials, it is a conventional high-wing braced monoplane with fixed tricycle undercarriage. The pilot and passenger sit in side-by-side configuration.

The aircraft features folding wings. Standard engine is the  Rotax 912 air and liquid-cooled, four stroke, four cylinder piston aircraft engine.

Specifications (Chrysalin)

See also
Comparable aircraft:
 3Xtrim 3X55 Trener

References

External links

2000s French sport aircraft
Homebuilt aircraft
High-wing aircraft